Breitfuss Glacier is a glacier  long, which flows southeast from Avery Plateau into Mill Inlet to the west of Cape Chavanne, on the east coast of Graham Land. It was charted by the Falkland Islands Dependencies Survey (FIDS) and photographed from the air by the Ronne Antarctic Research Expedition in 1947. It was named by the FIDS for Leonid Breitfuss, a German polar explorer, historian, and author of many polar bibliographies.

See also
 List of glaciers in the Antarctic
 Glaciology

References 

Glaciers of Graham Land
Foyn Coast